

List of railways

Anyox Mines Railway 
Blakeburn Mines Railway 
Britannia Beach Mine Railway 
 BC Cement (Texada Island)
Coquitlam Lake Railway
Lang Bay Timber
 
Cornell Tramway
Columbia and Western Railway
Craigmont mines
Dolly Varden Mines
Kaslo and Slocan Railway
Hernando Island logging 
Nanaimo Tramway
White Pass and Yukon Route
Leonora and Mt. Sicker Railway
Dozier's Way (Seton Lake Tramway)
 BCER Stave Falls Branch
Sullivan Mine
Sooke Dam Railway
Western Peat Tramway

References

External links
 1929 film footage of a run on the Dolly Varden Railway
 Hayward Lake Railway Trail
 
British Columbia
Narrow gauge railways